Worthen Meadow Reservoir is a reservoir located in the Shoshone National Forest. The reservoir's two section earth-fill dam was constructed in 1958, and the reservoir acts as a supplemental supply of water for the City of Lander, Wyoming.

Recreation
Numerous trails and campsites are located near the reservoir including Worthen Meadow Campground and trail-heads leading into the Wind River Range.

Wildlife
The reservoir contains different species of fish including rainbow trout, brook trout and arctic grayling.

Safety Concerns

The reservoir's upstream location  from Lander creates a significant hazard to the city in the event of dam failure. However, the dam has been reinforced and maintained to avoid failure.

References